Prometheus is a figure in Greek mythology.

Prometheus may also refer to:

Astronomy and spaceflight
 Prometheus (moon), a moon of Saturn
 Prometheus (volcano), a volcano on Io
 1809 Prometheus, an asteroid
 Prometheus (rocket engine), a reusable rocket engine under development by the European Space Agency
 Prometheus (spacecraft), a proposed spacecraft by Orbital Sciences Corporation
 Project Prometheus, NASA's nuclear propulsion program

Film and television
 Prometheus, a 1965 film by Vlado Kristl
 Prometheus (1998 film), a film-poem by Tony Harrison
 Prometheus (2012 film), an alien science fiction film by Ridley Scott
 Prometheus: War of Fire, a 2019 South Korean television series featuring Ki Hong Lee
 Prometheus (Stargate), a fictional spacecraft from the Stargate franchise
 Prometheus, a fictional experimental aircraft in The Sound Barrier
 USS Prometheus, a fictional spacecraft in the episode "Message in a Bottle" of Star Trek: Voyager
 USS Prometheus, a fictional starship in the episode "Second Sight" of Star Trek: Deep Space Nine
 Prometheus CVS-101, a fictional super-carrier from Macross and Robotech
 Prometheus, a fictional steam ship from 1899 (TV series)

Gaming
 Robo or Prometheus, a Chrono Trigger character
 Prometheus, a The Conduit character
 Prometheus, a Mega Man ZX character
 PROMETHEUS, a series of battle droids in TimeSplitters: Future Perfect
 Prometheus, a Starsiege character, leader of the Cybrid Faction

Literature
 "Prometheus" (short story), a short story by Franz Kafka
 "Prometheus" (Goethe), a poem by Goethe
 Prometheus (DC Comics), several DC Comics supervillains
 Prometheus (Marvel Comics), a superhero
 Prometheus Award, an award for libertarian science fiction
 "Prometheus", an 1816 poem by Lord Byron
 "Prometheus", an 1832 poem by Thomas Kibble Hervey
 Prometheus, a series in the Appleseed franchise
 Prometheus, a character in Anthem, a novella by Ayn Rand

Music
 "Prometheus" (art song), an 1819 song by Franz Schubert
 "Prometheus" (Liszt), an 1850 symphonic poem
 Prometheus (opera), an opera by Rudolf Wagner-Régeny
 Prometheus (Orff), a 1968 opera by Carl Orff
 Prometheus (musician) or Benji Vaughan, British psychedelic trance musician
 Prometheus (soundtrack), a soundtrack album from the 2012 film
 "Prometheus: The Poem of Fire", a 1910 orchestral poem by Alexander Scriabin
 Prometheus: The Discipline of Fire & Demise, an album by Emperor
 "Prometheus, Symphonia Ignis Divinus", an album by Luca Turilli's Rhapsody
 Prometheus chord, a chord from Scriabin's harmonic language
 "Prometheus", a 2013 song by Erra from Augment
 "Prometheus", a 2015 song by Crystal Lake from The Sign

Organizations
 Prometheus Books
 Prometheus Camp, a Finnish summer camp
 Prometheus Entertainment
 Prometheus Film or Mezhrabpomfilm
 Prometheus Fuels
 Prometheus Global Media
 Prometheus Institute
 Prometheus Radio Project
 Prometheus Society

Transportation
 HMS Prometheus (1898), a Pelorus-class protected cruiser
 USS Prometheus (1814), a brig in the United States Navy
 USS Prometheus (AR-3), a repair ship that served during World War I and World War II
 Prometheus, a GWR Iron Duke Class locomotive (1850–1887)
 Prometheus, a GWR 3031 Class locomotive (1891–1915)
 Prometheus, a British Rail Class 76 (EM1) locomotive
 Eureka PROMETHEUS Project, a research project on driverless cars

Visual arts
 Prometheus (Manship), a sculpture in New York City
 Prometheus (Orozco), a fresco mural in Claremont, California
 Prometheus (Zach), a cast-iron sculpture by Jan Zach in Eugene, Oregon
 Prometheus, a bas-relief by Yuri Bosco in Tolyatti

Other uses
 Prometheus (moth), a genus of moths in the family Castniidae
 Prometheus (software), a monitoring system with a time series database
 Prometheus (tree), one of the oldest known trees

See also
 American Prometheus: The Triumph and Tragedy of J. Robert Oppenheimer, biography by Kai Bird and Martin J. Sherwin
 Prometeo (magazine), Spanish avant-garde magazine
 The Creatures of Prometheus, an 1801 ballet score by Beethoven
 Frankenstein; or, The Modern Prometheus, an 1818 novel by Mary Shelley
 HMS Prometheus, a list of ships
 Mayo v. Prometheus, an important case in US patent law
 "The Post-Modern Prometheus", the 1997 X-Files season 5 episode 5
 Promethea, a comic book series
 Promethea, a planet in Borderlands
 Promethean (disambiguation)
 Prométhée, a 1910 opera by Gabriel Fauré
 Prometheia, a 5th-century B.C. trilogy of plays by Aeschylus
 Prometheism, a Polish political project
 Prometheus Bound, a play traditionally attributed to Aeschylus
 Prometheus II, a Greek resistance organization during World War II
 Prometheus Unbound (disambiguation)
 Promethium (disambiguation)
 USS Prometheus, a list of ships